KWPB-LP (98.7 FM, "Winds of Praise") is a low-power radio station broadcasting a contemporary Christian music format. Licensed to Newport, Oregon, United States, the station is currently owned by Winds of Praise Broadcasting.

References

External links
 
 

WPB-LP
Contemporary Christian radio stations in the United States
Newport, Oregon
Radio stations established in 2003
2003 establishments in Oregon
WPB-LP